Wawaka is an unincorporated community in Elkhart Township, Noble County, in the U.S. state of Indiana.

History
Wawaka was founded in 1857. The name Wawaka is said to be of Native American origin, meaning "big heron". A post office has been in operation at Wawaka since 1857.

Geography

Notable people
 Ford Frick, sportswriter

References

Unincorporated communities in Noble County, Indiana
Unincorporated communities in Indiana
1857 establishments in Indiana